This is a list of notable Latvian sportspeople.

Athletics
Jānis Bojārs
Māris Bružiks
Adalberts Bubenko
Jānis Daliņš
Aigars Fadejevs
Laura Ikauniece
Inese Jaunzeme
Igors Kazanovs
Inta Kļimoviča
Ainārs Kovals
Dainis Kūla
Jānis Lūsis
Staņislavs Olijars
Elvīra Ozoliņa
Jeļena Prokopčuka
Ineta Radēviča
Juris Silovs
Māris Urtāns
Vadims Vasiļevskis

Basketball
Elīna Babkina
Ainars Bagatskis
Andris Biedriņš
Tamāra Dauniene
Zane Jākobsone
Rūdolfs Jurciņš
Kaspars Kambala
Alfrēds Krauklis
Igors Miglinieks
Jānis Lidmanis
Uljana Semjonova
Aleksandrs Vanags
Valdis Valters
Gundars Vētra

Beach Volleyball
Mārtiņš Pļaviņš
Aleksandrs Samoilovs
Jānis Šmēdiņš

Biathlon
Ilmārs Bricis
Oļegs Maļuhins
Andrejs Rastorgujevs

Bobsleigh
Intars Dambis
Daumants Dreiškens
Jānis Ķipurs
Oskars Melbārdis
Jānis Miņins
Guntis Osis
Jānis Strenga
Arvis Vilkaste

Canoeing
Ivans Klementjevs

Cycling
Dainis Ozols
Māris Štrombergs

Fencing
Bruno Habārovs

Figure skating
Elena Berezhnaya
Oleg Shliakhov

Gymnastics
Natalia Lashchenova
Jevgēņijs Saproņenko
Igors Vihrovs

Ice hockey
Helmuts Balderis
Oskars Bārtulis
Zemgus Girgensons
Viktors Hatuļevs
Sandis Ozoliņš
Vitali Samoilov
Kārlis Skrastiņš

Judo
Ārons Bogoļubovs
Jevgeņijs Borodavko
Aleksandrs Jackēvičs
Deniss Kozlovs
Konstantīns Ovčiņņikovs
Vsevolods Zeļonijs

Luge
Ingrīda Amantova
Zigmars Berkolds
Sandris Bērziņš
Dainis Bremze
Inārs Kivlenieks
Aigars Kriķis
Anna Orlova
Guntis Rēķis
Mārtiņš Rubenis
Elīza Tīruma
Maija Tīruma
Andris Šics
Juris Šics
Vera Zozulya

Modern Pentathlon
Deniss Čerkovskis
Jeļena Rubļevska

Rowing
Juris Bērziņš
Artūrs Garonskis
Maya Kaufmane
Dimants Krišjānis
Dzintars Krišjānis
Aivars Lazdenieks
Daina Schweiz
Sarmīte Stone
Žoržs Tikmers

Shooting
Haralds Blaus
Afanasijs Kuzmins

Short track speed skating
Haralds Silovs

Skeleton
Martins Dukurs
Tomass Dukurs

Speed skating
Alfons Bērziņš
Haralds Silovs
Lāsma Kauniste

Swimming
Georgi Kulikov
Arsens Miskarovs

Tennis
Jelena Ostapenko
Līga Dekmeijere
Ernests Gulbis
Zaiga Jansone
Larisa Neiland
Anastasija Sevastova

Volleyball
Oļegs Antropovs
Astra Biltauere
Ivans Bugajenkovs
Staņislavs Lugailo
Pāvels Seļivanovs
Tatyana Veinberga
Raimonds Vilde

Weightlifting
Vasilijs Stepanovs
Viktors Ščerbatihs

Wrestling
Jānis Beinarovičs
Edvīns Bietags
Anastasija Grigorjeva

See also
Latvia at the Olympics
Sport in Latvia

 
Latvian sportspeople